Marske United F.C. was established in 1956 by members of Marske Cricket Club.  They initially played in the Cleveland League and then the South Bank League before moving up to the Teesside League in 1976.

Key

Key to league record
 Lvl = Level of the league in the current league system
 Pld = Games played
 W = Games won
 D = Games drawn
 L = Games lost
 GF = Goals for
 GA = Goals against
 GD = Goals difference
 Pts = Points
 Position = Position in the final league table

Key to cup records
 Res = Final reached round
 Rec = Final club record in the form of wins-draws-losses
 EP= Extra Preliminary round
 PR = Premilinary round
 QR1 = Qualifying round 1
 QR2 = Qualifying round 2
 QR3 = Qualifying round 3
 QR4 = Qualifying round 4
 R1 = Round 1
 R2 = Round 2
 R3 = Round 3
 R4 = Round 4
 R5 = Round 5
 R6 = Round 6
 QF = Quarter-finals
 SF = Semi-finals
 RU = Runners-up
 W = Winners

Seasons
In the non-league system where there is promotion and relegation there is the necessity for those in charge of scheduling matches to move some teams between different regional leagues at the same level to ensure as even a geographical spread as possible.

Timeline notes

The records for the 1976–77 were complete only to 30 April 1977.
The records for the 1977–78 were complete only to 8 April 1978.
In the 1986–87 season, 3 points for a win was introduced.
At the end of the 1987–88 Season of the Wearside League, the league formed a new second division and changed the top division name accordingly.
In the 1993–94 season of the Wearside league, the club were deducted 3 points for an infringement of the league rules. It cost them the league title.
By the end of the 1995–96 season, the number of clubs leaving the Wearside League Division 2 made it untenable to continue. Therefore, the league decided to move the remaining Division 2 teams into an expanded single league for the following season.
At the end of the 1996–97 season of the Wearside League, the club moved to join the Northern League Division 2. 
Despite being Northern League Division 1 Champions in 2014–15, the club were not promoted as it was not an automatic right. To be promoted any club finishing in the top 3 had to satisfy three other citeria. This also applied to their second place finish the following season.
For the 2018–19 Northern Premier League season, Division 1 was re-organised into East and West as opposed to North and South.
For the 2019–20 the two divisions of Division One of the Northern Premier League were re-aligned from West and East to North West and South East. The club were transferred to the North West Division. The season was ultimately abandoned due to the COVID 19 pandemic as was the following season.

References

seasins
Marske United F.C.